Aldo Calderón van Dyke (died 14 August 2013) was a Honduran journalist that worked for Canal 11, La Prensa, and El Tiempo.  He committed suicide and died on 14 August 2013 at around ten at night in a Honduran Social Security Institute hospital.  He was buried in San Pedro Sula.

References

2013 deaths
Honduran journalists
Honduran television journalists
Male journalists
Place of birth missing
Suicides in Honduras
Year of birth missing